This article is the discography of British pop band Kajagoogoo and includes all the studio albums, live albums, compilations, and singles, as well as the peak chart positions for the United Kingdom, Austria1, Germany, Netherlands1, New Zealand, Sweden1, Switzerland and United States.

Albums

Studio albums

Live albums

Compilation albums

Extended plays

Singles

Non-album singles

Videography
 1983 – Kajagoogoo: White Feathers Tour (Picture Music International: VHS/Beta/Laserdisc/CED)[Picture Music International]
 1983 – Too Shy – The Video E.P. (Picture Music International: VHS/Beta/Laserdisc [PMI/Pioneer Artists])
 2009 – Too Shy: the Best of Kajagoogoo & Limahl (CD & DVD) [EMI]

Notes
1 – In the Netherlands, there are the catalogue rules in the albums chart from 2003. From this date, a back catalogue chart was established. In Sweden and Norway the albums chart is divided into Top Fullprice Albums and Top Midprice Albums. Furthermore, prior September 1993, the charts in Sweden were bi-weekly, as well as the charts in Austria during the '80s (monthly in the '70s).

2 – Digital release.

References

Pop music group discographies
New wave discographies
Discographies of British artists